The 1931 Ball State Cardinals football team was an American football team that represented Ball State Teachers College (later renamed Ball State University) in the Indiana Intercollegiate Conference (IIC) during the 1931 college football season. In their second season under head coach Lawrence McPhee, the Cardinals compiled a 2–6 record (2–5 against IIC opponents), finished in 13th place out of 15 teams in the IIC, and were outscored by a total of 161 to 65. The team played its home games at Ball State Athletic Field in Muncie, Indiana.

Schedule

References

Ball State
Ball State Cardinals football seasons
Ball State Cardinals football